Procyanidin B2 is a B type proanthocyanidin. Its structure is (−)-Epicatechin-(4β→8)-(−)-epicatechin.

Procyanidin B2 can be found in Cinchona pubescens (Chinchona: in the rind, bark, and cortex), in Cinnamomum verum (Ceylon cinnamon: in the rind, bark, and cortex), in Crataegus monogyna (Common hawthorn: in the flower and blossom), in Uncaria guianensis (Cat's claw: in the root), in Vitis vinifera (Common grape vine: in the leaf), in Litchi chinensis (litchi: in the pericarp), in the apple, and in Ecdysanthera utilis.

Procyanidin B2 can be converted into procyanidin A2 by radical oxidation using 1,1-diphenyl-2-picrylhydrazyl (DPPH) radicals under neutral conditions.

Procyanidin B2 has been shown to inhibit the formation of the advanced glycation end-products pentosidine, carboxymethyllysine (CML), and methylglyoxal (MGO).

See also 
 Phenolic content in wine

References 

Procyanidin dimers